Immortal Pride is the fourth full-length studio album by Polish black metal band Graveland. Initially it was released as a tape by Rob Darken's own label Eastclan. CD and vinyl versions were released by No Colours Records, with the vinyl edition limited to 500 copies.
The album is unique among Graveland releases in its extensive use of melodic vocals, performed in a chanting style, alongside Darken's typical growls.

Track listing 
All songs written by Rob "Darken" Fudali.
 "Intro (Day of Fury)" - 3:21 
 "Sons of Fire and Steel / Outro (Servants of War)" - 23:39
 "Sacrifice for Honour" - 16:26
 "Outro (To Die in Glory)" - 7:01

Personnel 
 Darken: Vocals, electric, acoustic & bass guitars, keyboards, synthesizers
 Capricornus: Drums, percussion

Production 
 Produced by Darken
 Recorded & mixed by Grzegorz Czachor & Darken
 Christophe Szpajdel - logo

References

External links 
SSMT Review

1998 albums
Graveland albums
No Colours Records albums